La Loretana is a Peruvian football club, playing in the city of Pucallpa.

The club was founded 1 May 1971 and plays in the Copa Perú which is the third division of the Peruvian league.

History
The club was 1995 Copa Perú champion, when defeated Sportivo Huracán, Deportivo Marsa, Deportivo Municipal (Andahuaylas), Diablos Rojos (Huancavelica), and Universidad Técnica de Cajamarca.

The club have played at the highest level of Peruvian football on two occasions, from 1996 Torneo Descentralizado until 1997 Torneo Descentralizado when was relegated.

US Players who played on team: Quin O'Sullivan 1996, John Bragg 1997.

In the 1998 Copa Perú, the club was eliminated by Colegio Nacional Iquitos in the regional stage's playoff.

Honours

National
Copa Perú: 1
Winners (1): 1995

Regional
Región III: 0
 Runner-up (1): 1998

Liga Departamental de Ucayali: 2
Winners (2): 1994, 1995

See also
List of football clubs in Peru
Peruvian football league system

 

Football clubs in Peru
Association football clubs established in 1971
1971 establishments in Peru